Dittmar is a German surname. Notable people with the surname include:

 Andy Dittmar (born 1974), athlete 
 Chris Dittmar (born 1964), squash player
 G. Walter Dittmar (1872–1949), dentist
 Gudrun Klaus-Dittmar, sprint canoer
 Hans Dittmar (1902–1967), sailor 
 Heini Dittmar (1912–1960), glider pilot
 Kurt Dittmar (1891–1959), general 
 Louise Dittmar (1807–1884), German feminist and philosopher
 Sabine Dittmar (born 1964), German politician
 Trudy Dittmar (born 1944), author
 Wally Dittmar (died 1983), football player
 William Dittmar (1833–1892), scientist

See also
 Ditmar (disambiguation)

Surnames from given names
German-language surnames